The 8th International Film Festival of India was held from 3–16 January 1981 in New Delhi, India.

Winners
Golden Peacock (Best Film):  "The Unknown Soldier’s Patent Leather Shoes" by Rangel Valchanov and "Aakrosh" by Govind Nihalani
Golden Peacock (Best Short Film) "A Period of Transition" (Denmark film)

References

1981 film festivals
08
1981 in Indian cinema